The 1928 U.S. Open was the 32nd U.S. Open, held June 21–24 at Course No. 4 of Olympia Fields Country Club in Olympia Fields, Illinois, a suburb south of Chicago. Johnny Farrell defeated noted amateur Bobby Jones in a 36-hole playoff to win his only major title. For Jones, a two-time champion in 1923 and 1926, it was his second playoff loss at the U.S. Open in four years and his fourth finish as a runner-up. He won the next two in 1929 and 1930.

Jones jumped out to the 36-hole lead with rounds of 73-71, two shots ahead of George Von Elm and Bill Leach. After a 73 in the third round, Jones took a two-stroke lead over Leach and Henry Ciuci into the final round. Five strokes behind Jones was Farrell, who had recorded rounds of 77-74-71. Farrell teed off well before Jones and shot 72 and a 294 total. With Jones still on the course with the lead, Farrell did not believe he had a chance of winning. In his final round, Jones was uncharacteristically erratic on holes six through ten, at seven-over-par for those five holes. He regrouped on the last eight holes and carded a 77 (+6) for 294 (+10). Gene Sarazen informed Farrell in the clubhouse that he and Jones were tied. Roland Hancock, age 21, would have won the championship by two strokes had he parred the final two holes, but he double-bogeyed 17 and bogeyed 18 to fall a shot out of the playoff.

This was the first year that the USGA implemented a 36-hole playoff. On the first 18, Farrell shot a 70 to Jones' 73. Beginning the second 18, however, Jones quickly got back to all square after two holes. Jones double-bogeyed the 4th to give Farrell a two-stroke lead once again, but three consecutive bogeys beginning at the 10th knocked Farrell out of the lead. Now trailing by one with six holes to play, Farrell nearly aced the par-3 13th, recording a birdie to tie up the match. At the 16th, Jones missed a short putt to give Farrell the lead. Jones made his birdie putt to put pressure on Farrell, who responded by holing out. At the par-5 18th, both Jones and Farrell recorded birdies, clinching a one-stroke victory for Farrell in the rain.

The next playoff at the U.S. Open was the following year, won by Jones by 23 strokes. The playoff in 1931 was tied after 36 holes, resulting in a second 36-hole playoff, which caused the USGA to return to the 18-hole format. The next playoff in 1939 was reduced back to 18 holes, but the top two competitors were tied and it went another 18 holes. Sudden-death following the round was not introduced until the 1950s, and not needed until 1990; it was used again in 1994 and 2008.

The four 18-hole courses at Olympia Fields were reduced to two in the late 1940s when the club sold half of its property. Course No. 4 became the North course, and the South course is a composite of holes from the other three.

Course layout

Course No. 4

Source:

Past champions in the field

Made the cut 

Source:

Missed the cut 

Source:

Round summaries

First round
Thursday, June 21, 1928

Source:

Second round
Friday, June 22, 1928

Source:

Third round
Saturday, June 23, 1928 (morning)

Source:

Final round
Saturday, June 23, 1928 (afternoon)

Source:
(a) denotes amateur

Scorecard
Final round

Cumulative tournament scores, relative to par
Source:

Playoff
Sunday, June 24, 1928   (36 holes)

Scorecards
Morning round

Afternoon round

Cumulative playoff scores, relative to par

Source:

References

External links
USGA Championship Database
USOpen.com - 1928
Olympia Fields Country Club

U.S. Open (golf)
Golf in Illinois
U.S. Open
U.S. Open golf
U.S. Open golf
U.S. Open golf